The Holy Face of Lucca is an , ancient wooden carving of Jesus crucified in the cathedral of San Martino, Lucca, Italy. Medieval legends state that it was sculpted by Nicodemus who assisted St. Joseph of Arimathea in placing Christ in his tomb after the crucifixion. The same legends placed its miraculous arrival in Lucca to AD 782.

Radiocarbon dating of both wood and canvas places it between 770–880 AD, which corresponds to the Legend of Leobino according to which the Holy Face arrived from Palestine to Lucca in 782 (another copy says 742).

The Holy Face is located in the free-standing octagonal Carrara marble chapel (the tempietto or "little temple"), which was built in 1484 by Matteo Civitali, the sculptor-architect of Lucca, to contain it. The tempietto stands in the left-hand aisle of the cathedral of San Martino in Lucca.

Copies of a similar size from the 12th century are found widely spread across Europe. These include the Cross of Imervard in the Brunswick Cathedral at Braunschweig, Germany, the Holy Face of Sansepolcro at Sansepolcro, Italy and possibly the Batlló Crucifix of Barcelona, Spain. The Holy Face is also depicted on a 14th-century gothic fresco in a Lutheran church in Štítnik, Slovakia.

"By the Holy Face of Lucca" was a phrase often used by William Rufus when swearing to perform an act or deed during his reign as King of England.

History 

In the traditional account, the year 782 marks the arrival of the Holy Face in the Basilica di San Frediano; its transferral to the cathedral, justified by a miraculous translation in the Latin legend, De inventione, revelatione ac translatione Sanctissimi Vultus (or Leggenda di Leobino) may be connected with the episcopacy of Anselmo da Baggio (1060–70), who presented it at the consecration of the new Romanesque cathedral, 6 October 1070. Insistent details of the hagiographic legend (see below) also suggest that the image had previously been at Luni in Liguria, the former see of a bishopric and the early commercial rival of Lucca. Luni was a Byzantine possession that had been sacked by Saracens, disputed between Byzantines and Lombards, and reduced to a village by the eighth century.

The sculpture bears no stylistic relationship to Lombard sculpture of the tenth or eleventh century, however. The iconography of a completely robed crucified Christ wearing a colobium—an ankle-length tunic—is more familiar in the East than in the West, although a near life-size Crucifixion, carved in the round, is contrary to Byzantine norms. Life-size crucified Christs were more common in Germany from the late eleventh century, following the Gero Cross of Cologne Cathedral of about 970, which seems to have been the prototype. The long robe may be a Byzantine influence, although many Western examples also exist, in Ottonian illuminated manuscripts and other media. The belt of the Holy Face is unprecedented in a Crucifixion from either East or West.

In Lucca, an annual candlelit procession, the Luminara, is devoted to the Holy Face on 13 September, the eve of religious celebrations on the following day. The procession, which today no longer includes the sculpture as in the past, walks to the cathedral from the Basilica of San Frediano, where a fresco cycle commemorates the legend of Nicodemus' sculpting the image from cedar of Lebanon, during which, having completed all but the face, Nicodemus slept, awaking to find the Holy Face completed by an angel. In Eastern Christianity, similar legends accrue round icons said to be acheiropoieta, "not made by human hands".

Discovered in a cave in the Holy Land by "Bishop Gualfredo", who was guided by a revelatory dream, the image was carried first to the Tuscan port of Luni in a boat without sails or crew. But the men of Luni, when they tried to board the boat, found that it retreated miraculously from their grasp. Warned by an angel in a revelatory dream that the Holy Face had arrived in Luni, Johannes, bishop of Lucca, with his clerics and a great crowd of Lucchesi, arrived at Luni, bade a stop to the attempts to retrieve the boat and, by calling upon God, found that the ship came miraculously to Johannes and opened to him its gangplank. When the people saw the Holy Face they wept tears of joy and cried Gloria in excelsis.  

Once ashore, the legend brings the image to Lucca in a cart pulled by oxen with no driver, in a further miraculous demonstration of the "rightness" of its possession by the city of Lucca, and having been deposited in the church of San Frediano, it is miraculously translated to the church of San Martino, which was interpreted as the rationale for choosing this church as the cathedral. Thus the possession of the image by Lucca rather than Luni, and its location in its rightful church, were both justified by legend.

Its popularity was expressed in copies as well as legends, to satisfy the pilgrims who made the cathedral of Lucca the goal of their voyages from all parts of Europe. Like other famous relics or images, such as the Virgin's Belt of Prato to this day, it appears to have often only been available to view on certain appointed days in the year, and at least some of the time wore rich textile clothing as well as the wooden carved robe. "By the face of Lucca" was the 'customary oath' of William II of England. The Holy Face appears on medieval Luccan coins. Dante mentions the Holy Face of Lucca in his Inferno, Canto XXI, where a demon cries:
Qui non ha luogo il Volto Santo!
qui si nuota altrimenti che nel Serchio.

Legend of the fiddler

A legend of a fiddler devotee of the statue receiving a shoe in precious metal, with a number of variants in the story, is first recorded from the 12th century. Typically the statue allows the shoe to drop, or kicks it over to the fiddler (despite, in some versions, a nail through it). The fiddler may be a poor pilgrim, or a devotee who is rewarded for frequently playing in front of the statue; or he may only take up the fiddle after his good luck. The slipper may be filled with gold coins, and the slipper may be returned by the fiddler and the gift repeated. The fiddler may be tried for theft of the slipper, but escape condemnation. The legend also became part of the cult of Wilgefortis, the alter ego of the Holy Face.

Images showing the legend normally feature the fiddler playing below the statue, which is placed (as apparently in reality) just over an altar. The statue seems to be wearing actual clothes—like other much venerated statues, it seems to have been dressed in "festive clothes", at least some of the time. On the altar are the slipper, and a chalice below one of the statue's feet. This also reflects the medieval arrangement, where such a "chalice" was placed to receive offerings. In fact, it was fixed and lacked a bottom, and led to a tube that carried offerings to a strongbox below the altar.

Wilgefortis
At the end of the fourteenth century, such a Holy Face inspired miracles and veneration in the Low Countries, Bavaria and the Tyrol, though its connection with Lucca had been forgotten. The long robe worn by the statue appeared to signify that the figure was of a woman. To account for the beard, a legend developed of a young noblewoman who miraculously grew a beard in order to maintain her virginity. Her father, often said to be the king of Portugal, promised her in marriage to another pagan king. Wilgefortis, who had taken a vow of perpetual virginity, prayed to be made repulsive to her future husband. As a result, she grew a long, flowing beard. In a rage, her father had her crucified. Wilgefortis became a popular figure in folk Catholicism. As a result, she assumed various local names including Kümmernis in Germany or Sainte Débarras in France, and was duly entered in the Martyrologium Romanum in 1583, retaining a devoted following as late as the nineteenth century.

See also

Holy Face of Jesus
List of statues of Jesus

Notes

References
Baracchini, C. and A. Caleca, Il Duomo di Lucca, Lucca 1973, pp 14–15.
Friesen Ilse E., The Female Crucifix: Images of St. Wilgefortis Since the Middle Ages. (Waterloo, Ontario:Laurier University Press) 2001
Guerra, Giulio Dante, "La 'leggenda' del Volto Santo di Lucca, Cristianità 10August–September 1982, pp 88-89.
Pertusi, A, and F. Pertusi Pucci, "Il Crocifisso ligneo del Monastero di S. Croce e Nicodemo di Bocca di Magra" Rivista dell'Istituto Nazionale d'Archeologia e Storia dell'Arte (1979), pp 3–51.
Schnürer, Gustav and Joseph M. Ritz, St. Kümmernis und Volto Santo'', Düsseldorf 1934.

External links 
Il Volto Santo: leggenda, opera, analisi iconologica, tradizioni (Italian)
Religious traditions in Tuscany: Volto Santo
Volto Santo (Holy Face) Illus. with summary of the legends (English).

8th-century sculptures
Medieval European sculptures
Lucca
Crucifixes
Relics associated with Jesus
Nicodemus
Wooden sculptures in Italy